Kuntur Waqta (Quechua kuntur condor, waqta side, flank, "condor side", Hispanicized spelling Cóndorhuacta) is a mountain in the Cordillera Central in the Andes of Peru which reaches an altitude of approximately . It is located in the Lima Region, Yauyos Province, Laraos District.

References

Mountains of Peru
Mountains of Lima Region